Joseph Marwa (born 15 July 1964 in Musoma) is a retired male boxer from Tanzania, who represented his native East African country in two consecutive Summer Olympics, starting in 1988 (Seoul). Nicknamed The Hungry Lion he also competed at the 1990 Commonwealth Games. Marwa won a silver medal in the light-middleweight division at the 1991 All-Africa Games, losing in the final to Kabary Salem of Egypt.
Joseph Marwa is currently situated in Zanzibar, Tanzania and works as the head bouncer of a very well known hotel, Kendwa Rocks in Kendwa.

References

External links
 
 Profile
 thecgf

1964 births
Living people
People from Musoma
Tanzanian male boxers
Welterweight boxers
Light-middleweight boxers
Boxers at the 1988 Summer Olympics
Boxers at the 1992 Summer Olympics
Boxers at the 1990 Commonwealth Games
Olympic boxers of Tanzania
Commonwealth Games competitors for Tanzania
African Games silver medalists for Tanzania
African Games medalists in boxing
Competitors at the 1991 All-Africa Games
African Boxing Union champions